Air Commodore Robert Gordon,  (22 January 1882 – 25 September 1954) was an early British military aviator. As a Royal Marines officer he held various posts in the Royal Naval Air Service during the First World War. From 1918 onwards, he was a senior officer in the Royal Air Force. He notably commanded the RAF's Z Force in British Somaliland in 1920 as part of the Somaliland campaign.

Early life and career

Gordon was born 22 January 1882 in Rangoon, Burma. He was educated at Fettes College before joining the Royal Marines Light Infantry as a second lieutenant on 1 January 1900. In 1912, Gordon was among the first group of aviators to be taught at Eastchurch. He later became a flying officer in the Royal Flying Corps' Naval Wing when it was formed.

At the start of the first world war, Gordon commanded the naval air station at Dundee. In 1915, he moved to East Africa for operations to destroy the German cruiser Königsberg. For this work he was awarded the Distinguished Service Order. Following promotion to wing commander, Gordon served in Mesopotamia and Italy and then moved to the Eastern Mediterranean, where he commanded No. 2 Wing of the Royal Naval Air Service in the Aegean. He transferred to the Royal Air Force when it was formed in 1918 and after service in south Russia he was awarded a permanent commission in the RAF.

Following promotion to group captain, Gordon was to command the RAF in Egypt and British Somaliland. After his time in the latter protectorate, he was Officer Commanding No. 3 Group before taking up command of RAF Trans-Jordania. After some time as a supernumerary in 1923, Gordon attended the Senior Officers' Course at the Royal Naval College, Greenwich. The following year, he was appointed Officer Commanding No. 1 Group and 1925 saw Gordon promoted to air commodore and made Air Officer Commanding No. 3 Group in what was a return to his old command. Gordon retired at his own request only seven months later.

During the Second World War, Gordon returned to duty as the Scottish Deputy Area Commandant of the Observer Corps. He died on 25 September 1954.

References

External links
Air of Authority – A History of RAF Organisation – Air Commodore R Gordon

 

|-
 

|-
 

1882 births
1954 deaths
People from Yangon
Graduates of the Royal Naval College, Greenwich
Royal Flying Corps officers
British military personnel of the Fifth Somaliland Expedition
Companions of the Distinguished Service Order
Companions of the Order of St Michael and St George
Companions of the Order of the Bath
People of the Royal Observer Corps
Royal Air Force officers
Royal Marines officers
Royal Naval Air Service aviators
Royal Marines personnel of World War I
People educated at Fettes College
British people in British Burma